Khatiwas is a village in Jhajjar District of Haryana, India. It is one among 264 villages and five tehsils.
The village is situated on national highway (NH 334-b) main road from jhajjar to charki dadri. 
The village is dominated by Ahir clan and by sawlodhiya gotra. This village is known for its religious devotion towards Dada siraj wala ( a saint) from generations.

The village has an area of 587 hectares. In 2011 it contained 632 households accommodating a population of 3,234 (1,722 males and 1,512 females).

Prof. J.P. Yadav, eminent Indian biologist and professor of genetics, is from this village.

Nearby villages

 Kheri Khummar 
 Talao 
 Dhaur 
 M P Majra  
 Gwalison

References 

Villages in Jhajjar district